Azi Shahril bin Azmi (born 20 September 1985) is a Malaysian international footballer who plays as midfielder.

Club career
His high school is Sekolah Menengah Kebangsaan Putra Kangar, Perlis. Later, he was chosen to represent the team president cup Perlis before playing in the senior squad Perlis.

International career
He is a member of the Malaysia National and former Malaysia Under-23 squad.

Azi made his first international senior debut against New Zealand on 23 February 2006 as a substitute. Azi was stand-in captain of the side that beat Myanmar 3–1 in the final to win the 2007 Merdeka Tournament. The original captain Shukor Adan pulled out of the game because of injury.

Career statistics

Club

International

References

External links
 
 

1985 births
Living people
Malaysian people of Malay descent
Malaysian footballers
Malaysia international footballers
Perlis FA players
People from Perlis
Footballers at the 2006 Asian Games
Association football midfielders
Asian Games competitors for Malaysia